Tracey Lewis is an Australian Paralympic amputee swimmer.

She was born in Gympie, Queensland. At the 1984 New York/Stoke Mandeville Games, she competed in five events. She won three silver medals in the  Women's 100 m Backstroke A8, Women's 100 m Butterfly A8, and Women's 100 m Freestyle A8 events and a bronze medal in the Women's 200 m Individual Medley A8 event.  Her performances resulted in her being awarded the 1984 Queensland Sportsman of the Year.

References

External links
 

Year of birth missing (living people)
Living people
Female Paralympic swimmers of Australia
Paralympic silver medalists for Australia
Paralympic bronze medalists for Australia
Paralympic medalists in swimming
Amputee category Paralympic competitors
Swimmers at the 1984 Summer Paralympics
Medalists at the 1984 Summer Paralympics
Sportswomen from Queensland
People from Gympie
Australian amputees